"School Of Rock 'n Roll" is a song composed by James McClung in 1958 and published by Song Productions, BMI  the same year. It was originally recorded by Gene Summers and his Rebels, a rockabilly band from Dallas, Texas and was first released in February 1958 by Jan Records #11-100. It was flipped with "Straight Skirt"  a teen novelty 45  which became the group's first big regional hit.

"School Of Rock 'n Roll" later became widely known as one of the top 100 rock 'n roll records of the era.   In the 1970s, at the beginning of the rockabilly revival in Europe, "School Of Rock 'n Roll" was re-discovered by a new legion of rockabilly fans and bands. Since that time it has become a classic dance floor-filler and has renewed Summers' career to the extent of worldwide concert appearances since 1980.

Acclaim
In 2005 "School of Rock 'n Roll" was selected by Bob Solly and Record Collector Magazine as one of the 100 Greatest Rock 'n' Roll Records. "School Of Rock 'n Roll" was also present in the British television series You've Been Framed and was included on the Rhino Records CD box sets Wild, Fast And Out Of Control (1999) and Rockin' Bones (2006). The song has also been featured on "Bob Dylan's Theme Time Radio Hour" (2006) and also appears on the Bob Dylan 4-CD box set Radio Radio issued in 2011.

Cover versions 
(incomplete)
The Alphabets 					LP The Alphabets “Bowl You Over”

Rockhouse LPL 9201. 1991 Netherlands

The Blue Moon Rockers		        	CD The Blue Moon Rockers “School Of Rock & Roll”
								Rarity Records CD-192527, 1996 Belgium

Johnny Reno					LP Johnny Reno “Third Degree”
								Wildcat Records LP-JE3D, 1990 United States

Mess of Booze					CD Mess Of Booze “Ungehobelt & Versoffen”
								Tomb Records CD-2009, 1993 Germany

The Vees					CD The Vees  “Crash Boom Bang It Out”
								Rockhouse Productions CD RHS-50421-3, 1995 United States

Alan Leatherwood				CD Alan Leatherwood  “Rock, Bop, Folk, And Pop”
								Ohio Moon Records CD-790, 2004 United States 

The Starlight Wranglers	CD Starlight Wranglers “Rough House R&R Vol. 3 Various Artists”
								Rough House Records CD RHCD-003, 2004 Japan

The Greyhounds				CD The Greyhounds “Songs Our Daddies Taught Us”
								Pair Of Dice Records CD PODR-002, 2004 United States 

The Lennerockers				LP The Lennerockers “Rebels Of Nowadays”
								Rockhouse Records LP-9106, 1991 Netherlands

The Lennerockers 						CD Lennerockers “Rebels And More”
								Lenne Records 2CD LR-00008, 2002 Germany
								(previously unissued Lennerockers tracks)

Fairlane Rockets				CD Fairlane Rockets  “Fairlane Rockets”
								Raucous Records (record #) (date) UK

Red Hot Max And The Cats			LP Red Hot Max and the Cats “Cuckoo Clock Rock”
								Eagle Records LP NMLP-32, 1989 Sweden 

Savage Kalman & Explosion Rockets	LP Savage Kalman  “School Of Rock And Roll”
								Killroy Records LP KFA-13065, 1979 Netherlands

Savage Kalman & Explosion Rockets  						CD Savage Kalman “School Of Rock And Roll”
								SKY/Telstar Records (record #), 1998 Netherlands

Black Knights				CD Black Knights  “Jack In The Box”
								Old Rock Records CD ORR-20041, 2004 Sweden

The Rhythm Rockets				7” 45rpm single  “School Of Rock & Roll”  b/w “Let’s Dance”
								Presto Records P-101,  1989 United States

Rory Justice					CD Rory Justice  “The Rockabilly Kid”
								Golly Gee Records CD GGR-1031, 2004 United States 

Rockin’ Ryan and The  Real Goners		CD “Alive And Lowdown” ( w/ Rory Justice –‘live’ version
of "School Of Rock 'n Roll")
								Golly Gee Records CD GGR-(#),   2003 United States 

The Polecats					CD “Birth Of British Rockabilly Vol.2 Various Artists”
								NV Records CD NVCD-10, 1994 UK

Hicksville Bombers				CD Hicksville Bombers “Bombs Away”
								Cool And Crazy Records  COOL CD002, 1998, UK.
								“School Of Rock ‘n Roll” guitar riff was adapted to track #10
								titled “Yes, I Do”
Robby Vee                                         CD "The Early  Years" 
                                                                 
Arffytune Records, 2014 USA

Gene Vincent 					UNISSUED. Gene Vincent “School Of Rock ‘n Roll”
Private recording, the late 1960s. According to 1998  Now Dig This! review of Derek Henderson's book "Gene Vincent A  Discography", there is a Complete A-Z listing of the 217 song titles he’s (Vincent) known to have recorded-everything from the Capital biggies such as "Say Mama", "Rocky Road Blues", and "Wildcat" to lesser known items such as private recordings of "Stand by Me", "Chain Gang" and "School Of Rock 'n Roll". Also, according to Rockin' Ronnie Weiser during a May 19, 1997 interview: -“At first I tried to get Gene (Vincent) to record Gene Summers’ "School Of Rock 'n Roll" without much success. So then I told him to do whatever he wanted. The gem out of this 4-song recording session was “The Rose of Love” which brings tears to my eyes.”

Teen Kats					10” LP Teen Kats “After School Rock ‘n Roll”
						Big Beat Records BBR-0013, 1981 France
						“School Of Rock ‘n Roll was a huge influence for this record.”
						-Thierry LeCoz  of the Teen Kats, 1999

Thierry Lecoz					CD Thierry LeCoz “Tex-French Connection”
								Big Beat Records CD BBR-0081,  2003 France
								Recorded Onstage at the House Of Live, Paris, France July 3, 2002

Thierry LeCoz DVD “Tex-French Connection”
								BIG   Beat Records BBR DVD 0001,  2003 France
								Recorded Onstage at the House Of Live, Paris, France July 3, 2002

Gary U.S. Bonds				CD Gary U.S. Bonds School Of Rock ‘n Roll: The Best Of Gary U.S. Bonds Rhino/WEA, 1990 USA (Album title obviously inspired by Gene’s “School Of Rock ‘n Roll” 45 which was released in 1958. Bond’s earliest release was in 1960.)Lucky Strike Band CD Lucky Strike Band	"If I Had Me A Woman" (label) (CD #), UK 2003
Big Sandy & his Fly-Rite Boys			YouTube Video Big Sandy & his Fly-Rite Boys “School Of Rock ‘n Roll” 'Live from Café Sport - Delft, Netherlands  2005
Mike Mok and The Em-Tones			mp3 Mike Mok and the Em-Tones “School Of Rock ‘n Roll” “Live” studio cut..no overdubs, United States 2007
Los Aceleradores				mp3 Los Aceleradores “School Of Rock ‘n Roll”, 2004 Santiago, Chile, 2007
Various Artists School of Rock 'n Roll was used as the title for a (2) CD Box Set compilation released in the late 1990s. CD featured artists from the 1980s including J. Geils Band, Billy Squier, Steve Miller, The Motels, Glass Tiger, Culture Club, Sheena Easton and others. (CD title obviously inspired by the Gene Summers original, classic 'School Of Rock ‘n Roll')''

Sources
Liner notes "The Ultimate School Of Rock & Roll" 1997 United States
Article and sessionography in issue 15 (1977) of New Kommotion Magazine UK
Article and sessionography in issue 23 (1980) of New Kommotion Magazine UK
Feature article and sessionography in issue 74 (1999) of Rockin' Fifties Magazine Germany
Feature article with a photo spread in issue 53 (2000) of Bill Griggs' Rockin' 50s Magazine United States
Feature Article with a photo spread in issue 54 (2000) of Bill Griggs' Rockin' 50s Magazine United States

References

External links
 "School of Rock 'n Roll" 45rpm by Gene Summers on YouTube
 Bob Dylan's Theme Time Radio Hour - School
 Bob Dylan Plays "School of Rock 'n Roll"
 "100 Greatest Rock 'n Roll Records" (book includes "School of Rock 'n Roll")

Gene Summers songs
American songs
1958 debut singles
1958 songs